Melodía is the fourth album by Spanish singer Melody. She released it on October 18, 2004, at the age of 14. The album saw her move towards a more teenage demographic.

The album was produced by Danilo Ballo and a team led by Emanuele Ruffinengo, who had previously worked with Alejandro Sanz, Ana Belén, Ketama, Malú and Armando Manzanero. Two music videos, for the first single titled "Y ese niño" (composed by Lucas González Gómez from the duo Andy y Lucas), and for the second single titled "La novia es chiquita", were shot.

The album debuted at number 15 in Spain.

Track listing

Charts

References

External links 
 

2004 albums
Melody (Spanish singer) albums
Sony Music albums